Lamont A. "Monty" Kaser (September 24, 1941 – September 19, 2009) was an American professional golfer who played on the PGA Tour in the 1960s and 1970s.

A native of Wichita, Kansas, Kaser competed in amateur tournaments during the early and mid 1960s. He worked in the payroll department of a Wichita aircraft factory during his amateur career. His biggest win as an amateur came at the 1966 U.S. Amateur Public Links.

Kaser won one PGA Tour event during his professional career, the 1969 Indian Ridge Hospital Open Invitational, which was played at Indian Ridge Country Club in Andover, Massachusetts. His best finish in a major championship was T-46 at the 1970 U.S. Open.

After reaching the age of 50, Kaser played briefly on the Senior PGA Tour. Kaser died five days shy of his 68th birthday in Las Vegas, Nevada, where he had lived since retiring from golf. He had been suffering from prostate cancer.

Amateur wins
1962 Kansas Amateur Match Play Championship
1966 U.S. Amateur Public Links

Professional wins (1)

PGA Tour wins (1)

See also
1966 PGA Tour Qualifying School graduates

References

External links

American male golfers
PGA Tour golfers
PGA Tour Champions golfers
Golfers from Wichita, Kansas
Golfers from Nevada
People from the Las Vegas Valley
Deaths from prostate cancer
Deaths from cancer in Nevada
1941 births
2009 deaths